Horizon scanning may refer to:

 Literally horizon scanning performed by technical devices like infrared horizon-scanning
 Horizon scanning, a method from futures studies
 Horizon scanning, a former alternative name for environmental scanning